Sixty-three Guggenheim Fellowships were awarded in 1937.

1937 U.S. and Canadian Fellows

1937 Latin American and Caribbean Fellows

See also
 Guggenheim Fellowship
 List of Guggenheim Fellowships awarded in 1936
 List of Guggenheim Fellowships awarded in 1938

References

1937
1937 awards